Ātiamuri is a former hydro village in the central North Island of New Zealand. It lies alongside State Highway 1 about 27 km south of Tokoroa and 38 km north of Taupō. It is bordered by the Waikato River and surrounded by pine plantations. Upper Ātiamuri, just north of the Waikato River, is a small community of lifestyle blocks, dairy farms and farm servicing businesses.

Pohaturoa Rock (520 m) (also known as Mount Pohaturoa) is a distinctive volcanic plug that dominates the landscape. It overlooks Lake Ātiamuri which was formed behind the hydroelectric Atiamuri Power Station. This very visible rocky outcrop is significant in both Arawa and Ngāti Raukawa history, having been a strategic observation post during intertribal conflicts.

Demographics 
The area known as Ātiamuri is entirely within the Waikato Regional Council area but is in three district council areas: Rotorua Lakes, South Waikato and Taupo. Ātiamuri village is in the Taupō District.

The village is part of the larger Ohakuri statistical area.

Ātiamuri village had a population of 72 at the 2018 New Zealand census, an increase of 9 people (14.3%) since the 2013 census, and an increase of 6 people (9.1%) since the 2006 census. There were 21 households, comprising 36 males and 36 females, giving a sex ratio of 1.0 males per female. The median age was 33.2 years (compared with 37.4 years nationally), with 18 people (25.0%) aged under 15 years, 15 (20.8%) aged 15 to 29, 33 (45.8%) aged 30 to 64, and 6 (8.3%) aged 65 or older.

Ethnicities were 79.2% European/Pākehā, 37.5% Māori, and 12.5% Pacific peoples. People may identify with more than one ethnicity.

Although some people chose not to answer the census's question about religious affiliation, 62.5% had no religion, 20.8% were Christian, and 12.5% had Māori religious beliefs.

Of those at least 15 years old, 6 (11.1%) people had a bachelor's or higher degree, and 12 (22.2%) people had no formal qualifications. The median income was $27,400, compared with $31,800 nationally. 6 people (11.1%) earned over $70,000 compared to 17.2% nationally. The employment status of those at least 15 was that 33 (61.1%) people were employed full-time, 6 (11.1%) were part-time, and 3 (5.6%) were unemployed.

Atiamuri Power Station

Atiamuri Power Station is a hydroelectric power station on the Waikato River owned by Mercury Energy. It has a total capacity of 84 MW and was first commissioned in 1958.

Education

In Popular Culture 
Atiamuri was a filming location for the 1956 short film  and the 2018 feature film . Pōhaturoa Rock is visible in several establishment scenes in the latter film.

References

Taupō District
Populated places in Waikato
Geography of Waikato
Populated places on the Waikato River